SRE or Sre may refer to:

Organizations
 Secretaría de Relaciones Exteriores (Secretariat of Foreign Affairs), the foreign ministry of Mexico
 Swinging Radio England, a former commercial pirate radio station
 Sempra Energy (New York Stock Exchange symbol), an American utility holding company
 Samenwerkingsverband Regio Eindhoven, the former name of the regional governmental agency for the city region of Eindhoven, Netherlands
 Sancta Romana Ecclesia ("The Holy Roman Church"), often used in reference to the College of Cardinals of the Roman Catholic Church

Science and technology
 Site reliability engineering, a discipline that incorporates aspects of software engineering and applies that to operations
 Space Capsule Recovery Experiment, an Indian satellite
 Sodium Reactor Experiment, a former US experimental nuclear power plant
 Software reverse engineering
 Simple regular expression, a deprecated IEEE POSIX standard about regular expressions

Biology and medicine
 Serious Reportable Event, an inexcusable outcome in a healthcare setting
 Splicing regulatory element, a pre-mRNA element which regulates splicing acting in cis
 Serotonin reuptake enhancer, a type of reuptake enhancer
 Serum response element, a DNA cis-regulatory element recognized by the serum response factor
 Steroid response element, a type of hormone response element
 Sterol regulatory element, a DNA cis-regulatory element recognized by sterol regulatory element-binding proteins

Transportation
 Juana Azurduy de Padilla International Airport (IATA airport code), Sucre, Bolivia 
 Saharanpur Junction railway station (Indian Railways code), India

Other uses
 Seychellois rupee (SRe), the currency of the Seychelles
 Sex and Relationships Education, a form of sex education taught in the UK
 SRE, a dialect of the Koho language, a Bahnaric language spoken in Vietnam